Michel Braudeau (born 1946 in Niort) is a French writer.

He was editor-in-chief of the Nouvelle revue française, from 1999 to 2010.

Works 
 L'Amazone, Paris, éditions du Seuil, coll. « Écrire », 1966, 70 p.. Epuisé, rééd. Points, 1988
 Vaulascar, Paris, éditions du Seuil, coll. « Cadre rouge », 1977, 318 p..
 Passage de la Main- d'Or, Paris, éditions du Seuil, 1980, 219 p..
 Fantôme d'une puce, Paris, éditions du Seuil, coll. « Cadre rouge », 1982, 248 p..
 Naissance d'une passion, Paris, éditions du Seuil, coll. « Cadre rouge », 1985, 474 p.. Prix Médicis 1985.
 L'objet perdu de l'amour, Paris, éditions du Seuil, coll. « Cadre rouge », 1988, 535 p..
 Malaval, Bouchemaine, France, Présence de l'art contemporain, 1989.
 Le Livre de John, Paris, éditions du Seuil, coll. « Cadre rouge », 1992, 307 p..
 Mon ami Pierrot, Paris, éditions du Seuil, coll. « Cadre rouge », 1993, 188 p..
 Esprit de mai, Paris, éditions Gallimard, coll. « Blanche », 1995, 149 p..
 Loin des forêts, Paris, éditions Gallimard, coll. « Blanche », 1997, 335 p..
 La non-personne, Paris, éditions Gallimard, coll. « L'un et l'Autre », 2000, 102 p..
 L'Interprétation des singes, Paris, Éditions Stock, 2001, 680 p..
 Le Monarque et autres sujets, Paris, éditions Gallimard, coll. « Le cabinet des lettrés », 2001, 120 p..
 Six excentriques, Paris, éditions Gallimard, coll. « Blanche », 2003, 95 p..
 Retour à Miranda, Paris, éditions Gallimard, coll. « Blanche », 2003, 369 p..
 Le Rêve amazonien, Paris, éditions Gallimard, coll. « Blanche », 2004, 75 p..
 L'usage des saints, Paris, éditions Gallimard, coll. « Blanche », 2004, 92 p..
 L'étoile de Malaval, Bordeau, France, suivi de Attention à la peinture, William Blake And Co, 2005, 64 p..
 Sarabande, Paris, éditions Gallimard, coll. « Blanche », 2006, 253 p.
 Faussaires éminents, Paris, éditions Gallimard, coll. « Blanche », 2006, 77 p..
 Café : Cafés, Paris, éditions du Seuil, coll. « Fiction & Cie », 2007, 120 p.
 Zoo : Chroniques littéraires 1977-2008, Paris, éditions Gallimard, coll. « Les Cahiers de la NRF ».

Notes and references

21st-century French non-fiction writers
Prix Médicis winners
Prix Roger Caillois recipients
French male non-fiction writers
French literary critics
Commandeurs of the Ordre des Arts et des Lettres
People from Niort
1946 births
Living people
Nouvelle Revue Française editors
Translators of Noam Chomsky